Sidney Charles Clark (1894–1962) was a British architect, chief architect for Charrington's Brewery from 1924 to 1959.

Early life
Sidney Charles Clark was born in 1894.

Career
Clark was chief architect for Charrington's Brewery from 1924 to 1959.

He designed The Daylight Inn, a Grade II listed public house at Station Square, Petts Wood, Orpington, London, built in 1935 for Charrington's.

Personal life
Clark died in 1962.

References

1894 births
1962 deaths
Architects from London
Public house architects